A Soldier's Courtship is an 1896 British short silent drama film that was directed by R.W. Paul. It depicts a woman sitting on a bench, who is later approached by a soldier. At first, the woman refuses the soldier's advance on her, but later, they are kissing each other very excitedly.

Legacy
The Natural Science and Media Museum of England said that the film was "Britain’s, and arguably the world’s, first fiction film."

Lost film 
The Soldier's Courtship was originally a lost film, but was later discovered in the Centro Sperimentale di Cinematografia in Rome and was premiered at the Pordenone silent film festival in October 2011.

References 

1896 films
1890s British films
British silent short films
1896 short films
Films about military personnel